Lady Parry Island is an uninhabited island in Nunavut, Canada. It is located within the Kitikmeot Region's side of the Gulf of Boothia. It is east of the mainland's Boothia Peninsula, northwest of Hecla and Fury Islands.

It is named after Isabella Louisa Stanley, of Alderly, wife of Arctic explorer, Sir William Edward Parry.

References

Islands of the Gulf of Boothia
Uninhabited islands of Kitikmeot Region